Ernst Huber (born 18 May 1911, date of death unknown) was a Swiss sports shooter. He competed in two events at the 1952 Summer Olympics.

References

1911 births
Year of death missing
Swiss male sport shooters
Olympic shooters of Switzerland
Shooters at the 1952 Summer Olympics
Place of birth missing